National Secondary Route 101, or just Route 101 (or ) is a National Road Route of Costa Rica, located in the San José province.

Description
In San José province the route covers San José canton (Uruca district), Tibás canton (San Juan, Cinco Esquinas, Anselmo Llorente, Colima districts).

References

Highways in Costa Rica